Poland is a major video game market and home to one of the largest video game industries in the world. CD Projekt, developer of The Witcher and Cyberpunk 2077, is based in Poland. A significant portion of the Polish population plays video games, and Poland is the home to a developing esports market.

Market 
As of 2021, 97% of spending on video games in Poland is spent on foreign titles. The Polish gaming market was valued about US$924.2 million in 2020, with an esports market valued at US$11.5 million. Of game localizations on Steam, Polish typically ranks between the 9th or 10th most popular language of localization. There are 20 million video game players in Poland; of this group, over 80% are adults and about 49% are women. The Polish video game market has been described as emerging from the practice of trading pirated video games as a way of experiencing western culture under the Polish People's Republic. Poland hosts the esports tournament Intel Extreme Masters, which draws hundreds of millions of viewers. Among Polish citizens interested in esports, FIFA, League of Legends, and Counter-Strike were the most popular games as of 2020. Notable esports players from Poland include Counter-Strike player NEO and Quake player Av3k.

Development 
As of 2021, 96% of revenue in the Polish gaming industry comes from exporting video games to foreign countries, and the Polish gaming industry employed 12,110 people across 470 game companies. The largest video game company in Poland is CD Projekt. CD Projekt is most well known for developing action role-playing games, such as The Witcher video game series and Cyberpunk 2077. CD Projekt also operates the global video game distribution platform GOG.com. In 2019, Poland was the largest video game exporter in Europe and the fourth largest in the world, largely due to the success of The Witcher. The Polish government has invested into the country's video game industry and sees it as a vehicle for growth. Heavy emphasis on math in the Polish school curriculum has also been credited for the success of Poland's video game industry.

Several other Polish video game studios have developed video games to international acclaim. Flying Wild Hog is the developer of the Shadow Warrior series. Techland was the developer of Call of Juarez, Dead Island, and Dying Light. Bloober Team has developed several horror games, including Layers of Fear and The Medium. Ten Square Games has developed several successful mobile games. 11 Bit Studios was the developer of This War of Mine and Frostpunk. The Polish government placed This War of Mine on the official school reading list in 2020, making it the first video game to be put on such a list by a national government. The Polish game development industry has been praised for contributing to and spreading Poland's cultural heritage.

Notable Polish video games 
This is a list of notable video games that were primarily developed in Poland and sold at least one million units.

References

Bibliography 

 

Video gaming in Poland